Marja is a female given name, a Finnish, Sámi and Dutch form of Mary. It also means "berry" in Finnish. In Finnish the normal form of Mary is Maria; the pronunciations of Maria ['maria] and Marja ['marja] are identical, if the /-ria/ is pronounced as diphthong in as usual in rapid speech: [mari̯a]. As of December 2012, 53,000 people are registered with this name in Finland. In Finland, the nameday for Marja is the 15th of August.

Notable people

Some notable people with the name Marja are:

Marja van Bijsterveldt (born 1961), Dutch politician
Marja Heikkilä (born 1977), Finnish freestyle swimmer 
Marja-Liisa Kirvesniemi (born 1955), Finnish cross country skier
Marja Kok (born 1944), Dutch actress
Marja Lahti (1901–1967), Finnish politician
Marja Lehto (born 1959), Finnish diplomat
Marja Lehtonen (born 1968), Finnish bodybuilder
Marja Lubeck (born 1965), Dutch-born New Zealand politician
Marja Merisalo (born 1965), Finnish choreographer, dancer and director
Marja Mikkonen (born 1979), Finnish artist and filmmaker
Marja-Liisa Olthuis (born 1967), an Inari Sámi living in the Netherlands
Marja-Helena Pälvilä (born 1970), Finnish female ice hockey player
Marja Pärssinen (born 1971), Finnish butterfly and freestyle swimmer
Marja-Liisa Portin, Finnish orienteering competitor
Marja van der Tas (born 1958), Dutch politician
Marja Tiura (born 1969), Finnish politician 
Marja Vis (born 1977), Dutch speed skater
Marja Wokke (born 1957), Dutch marathon runner

See also
 Marjo (name)

References 

Dutch feminine given names
Finnish feminine given names